Pesochnoye is a rural locality (a village) in Seletskoye Rural Settlement, Suzdalsky District, Vladimir Oblast, Russia. The population was 20 as of 2010. There are 4 streets.

Geography 
Pesochnoye is located on the Uyechka River, 15 km southeast of Suzdal (the district's administrative centre) by road. Prudy is the nearest rural locality.

References 

Rural localities in Suzdalsky District